Ash-Shafā is a village in Makkah Province, in western Saudi Arabia.

Weather

See also 
 List of cities and towns in Saudi Arabia
 Regions of Saudi Arabia
 Sarat Mountains
 Hijaz Mountains

References

External links 

At-Ta'if
Populated places in Mecca Province